The Amstellyceum was a secondary school in Amsterdam, the Netherlands. It got cancelled and the Metis Montessori Lyceum is established there. The school was named after the river Amstel. It teaches, vmbo-tl, havo, and vwo (gymnasium and atheneum). In 2005, it had 480 students.

General 
The school was a Montessori Lyceum with directions Gymnasium (school), vwo (Atheneum), havo en vmbo-T. More than 50% of the students attended vmbo department of the school. In course year 08–09, the school had 504 students (including VAVO students) and 52 teachers. The pre-university education (VWO) is being phased out. There is a successful havo chance class.

Cooperation 
The school works with other montessorischools in Amsterdam. These are:

 Montessori Lyceum Amsterdam
 Montessori College Oost
 IVKO
 Cosmicus Montessori Lyceum

See also 
 List of schools in the Netherlands

Schools in Amsterdam